Anzola d'Ossola is a comune (municipality) in the Province of Verbano-Cusio-Ossola in the Italian region Piedmont, located about  northeast of Turin and about  northwest of Verbania.  It occupies a small alluvial plain near the Toce river: its name derives perhaps from a meander (Italian: ansa) once formed here by the river. In the Middle Ages it was a possession of the bishops of Novara and the Counts of Biandrate, until in 1322 it was acquired with the whole lower Val d'Ossola by the Visconti of Milan.

Anzola d'Ossola borders the following municipalities: Massiola, Ornavasso, Pieve Vergonte, Premosello-Chiovenda, Valstrona.

References

External links
 Official website

Cities and towns in Piedmont